Myrtella is a genus of plants in the Myrtaceae described as a genus in 1877. It is native to New Guinea and to  some islands of the western Pacific.

Accepted species
 Myrtella beccarii F.Muell. - New Guinea, Solomon Islands
 Myrtella bennigseniana (Volkens) Diels - New Guinea, Caroline Islands, Mariana Islands

Formerly included
now classified in other genera: Kania, Lithomyrtus, Uromyrtus 
 Myrtella cordata - Lithomyrtus cordata  
 Myrtella hirsutula - Kania hirsutula 
 Myrtella microphylla - Lithomyrtus microphylla  
 Myrtella obtusa - Lithomyrtus obtusa  
 Myrtella phebalioides - Lithomyrtus retusa 
 Myrtella retusa - Lithomyrtus retusa 
 Myrtella rostrata - Uromyrtus rostrata

References

 
Myrtaceae genera